Ani Mijačika (born 15 June 1987) is a Croatian former tennis player. On 17 October 2011, she reached her highest WTA singles ranking of 193 whilst her best doubles ranking was 222 in September 2011.

Mijačika retired from professional tennis in September 2014, but she has resurfaced in low level ITF events as of April 2016, and has played matches until September 2018.

ITF Circuit finals

Singles: 17 (10 titles, 7 runner-ups)

Doubles: 17 (10 titles, 7 runner-ups)

Fed Cup participation

Singles

References

External links
 
 
 

1987 births
Living people
Sportspeople from Makarska
Croatian female tennis players
Clemson Tigers women's tennis players